Parallel Play is the ninth studio album by Canadian rock band Sloan. At the time of its release, it was the band's shortest studio album. The first single released from the album was "Believe in Me", with "I'm Not a Kid Anymore" also being released as a single. A music video was also produced for the song "Witch's Wand". The song "The Other Side" was featured on the popular American television series, Castle. The album was nominated for "Rock Album of the Year" at the 2009 Juno Awards.

Track listing

References

2008 albums
Sloan (band) albums
Murderecords albums